Anscar of Ivrea may refer to:
Anscar I of Ivrea (died 902), margrave
Anscar of Spoleto (died 940), duke, also Anscar II of Ivrea